CBD loop may refer to:

City Circle - in Sydney, Australia
City Circle tram - in Melbourne, Australia
City Loop - in Melbourne, Australia
Perth Central Area Transit - in Perth, Australia